The House on Mango Street is a 1984 novel by Mexican-American author Sandra Cisneros. Structured as a series of vignettes, it tells the story of Esperanza Cordero, a 12-year-old Chicana girl growing up in the Hispanic quarter of Chicago. Based in part on Cisneros's own experience, the novel follows Esperanza over the span of one year in her life, as she enters adolescence and begins to face the realities of life as a young woman in a poor and patriarchal community. Elements of the Mexican-American culture and themes of social class, race, sexuality, identity, and gender are interwoven throughout the novel.

The House on Mango Street is considered a modern classic of Chicano literature and has been the subject of numerous academic publications in Chicano Studies and feminist theory. The book has sold more than 6 million copies, has been translated into over 20 languages and is required reading in many schools and universities across the United States.

It was on The New York Times Best Seller list and is the recipient of several major literary awards, including the American Book Award from the Before Columbus Foundation. It was adapted into a stage play by Tanya Saracho, which was staged in Chicago in 2009.

Because the novel deals with sensitive subject matters, such as domestic violence, puberty, sexual harassment, and racism, it has faced challenges and threats of censorship. In spite of this, it remains an influential coming-of-age novel and is a staple piece of literature for many young adults.

Background 
Cisneros has discussed the relationship between her own personal experiences and Esperanza's life as depicted in The House on Mango Street.  Like her protagonist, Esperanza, Cisneros is Mexican-American and was born and raised in a Hispanic neighborhood in Chicago. Yet there are differences; for instance, where Esperanza has two brothers and a sister, Cisneros was "the only daughter in a family of seven children". Earlier, Cisneros suggested that as the only girl in a family of boys, she often felt isolated. Cisneros attributes "her impulse to create stories" to "the loneliness of those formative years".

While completing an MFA in creative writing at the Iowa Writers Workshop, Cisneros first discovered a sense of her own ethnic "otherness", and at this time she felt marginalized "as a person of color, as a woman, as a person from working-class background". In an interview, Cisneros stated that during her graduate studies, when she began writing The House on Mango Street, she found the academic atmosphere highly discouraging. She remembered finding her classmates' backgrounds very different than her own and realized she had little in common with them: "I was so angry, so intimidated by my classmates that I wanted to quit. But ... I found a way to write … in reaction to being there I started to have some Mango Street almost as a way of claiming this is who I am. It became my flag". Cisneros created Esperanza from these personal feelings of displacement.

Synopsis 
The House on Mango Street covers the formative years of Esperanza Cordero, a young Chicana girl living in an impoverished Chicago neighborhood with her parents and three siblings. Before settling into their new home, a small and run-down building with crumbling red bricks, the family moved frequently, always dreaming of having a house of their own. When they finally arrive at the house on Mango Street, it is not the promised land of their dreams, but Esperanza’s  parents claim that that Mango Street is only a temporary stop before they reach the promised house. While a significant improvement from her family's previous dwellings, Esperanza expresses disdain towards her new home because it is not a "real" house like the ones she has seen on TV. Pining for a white, wooden house with a big yard and many trees, Esperanza finds her life on Mango Street suffocating and yearns to escape. She begins to write poetry to express these feelings. Esperanza begins the novel with detailed descriptions of the minute behaviors and characteristics of her family members and unusual neighbors, providing a picture of the neighborhood and examples of the many influential people surrounding her. She describes time spent with her younger sister, Nenny, and two older girls she befriends in the neighborhood; Alicia, a promising young college student with a dead mother, and Marin, who spends her days babysitting her younger cousins. Esperanza highlights significant or telling moments both in her own life and those in her community, mostly explaining the hardships they face, such as her neighbor being arrested for stealing a car or the death of her Aunt Lupe.

As the vignettes progress, Esperanza matures and develops her own perspective of the world around her. Esperanza eventually enters puberty and changes sexually, physically, and emotionally, beginning to notice and enjoy male attention. She befriends Sally, an attractive girl who wears heavy makeup and provocative clothing, and is physically abused and forbidden from leaving her home by her strongly religious father. Sally's and Esperanza's friendship is compromised when Sally ditches Esperanza for a boy at a carnival, leaving Esperanza to be sexually assaulted by a group of men. She recounts other instances of assault she has faced, like an older man forcibly kissing her at her first job. Esperanza's traumatic experiences and observations of the women in her neighborhood, many of whom are controlled by the men in their lives, only further cement her desire to leave Mango Street. It is only when Esperanza meets Rachel and Lucy's aunts, who tell her fortune, that she realizes her experiences on Mango Street have shaped her identity and will remain with her even if she leaves. As the novel ends, Esperanza vows that after she leaves, she will return to help the people she has left behind.

Structure
The novel is composed of forty-four interconnected vignettes, of varying lengths, ranging from one or two paragraphs to several pages. The protagonist, Esperanza, narrates these vignettes in first-person present tense.

In the afterword for the 25th-anniversary publication of The House on Mango Street, Cisneros commented on the style she developed for writing it: "She experiments, creating a text that is as succinct and flexible as poetry, snapping sentences into fragments so that the reader pauses, making each sentence serve her and not the other way round, abandoning quotation marks to streamline the typography and make the page as simple and readable as possible." Cisneros wanted the text to be easily read by people like those she remembered from her youth, particularly people who spent all day working with little time to devote to reading. In her words: "I wanted something that was accessible to ... someone who comes home with their feet hurting like my father."

In 2009, Cisneros wrote a new introduction to the novel. Here she includes a few remarks on the process of writing the book. She had first come up with a title "The House on Mango Street"; under it she included several stories, poems, vignettes, that she had already written or was in the process of writing. She adds that she does not consider the book a novel but as a "jar of buttons," a group of mismatched stories. These stories were written over different periods of time, the first three were written in Iowa as a side project, for at the time Cisneros was studying for a MFA. When orchestrating this book, Cisneros wanted it to be "a book that can be opened at any page and will still make sense to the reader who doesn't know what came before or comes after." She says the people she wrote about were real, amalgamations of persons she met over the years. She tailored together events of the past and the present so that the story being told could have a beginning a middle and an end, and that all the emotions felt are hers.

Characters

Esperanza Cordero – The House on Mango Street is written through the eyes of Esperanza Cordero, who is an adolescent girl living in a working-class Latino neighbourhood in Chicago. Esperanza is intrigued by the idea of being a Mexican American woman in Chicago, which reflects the author herself just 15 years prior to publishing this book. We follow this young woman coming into her sexual maturity and observe her undying struggle to make new possibilities for herself. The reader also encounters Esperanza living between two cultures, the Mexican one which she encounters through her parents and the American culture in which she finds herself living. Throughout the book, we see Esperanza reject her Chicana community as a means to forge and establish her own identity.

As her name suggests, Esperanza is a "figure of hope, a 'fierce woman' on a complex pursuit for personal and community transformation.". Esperanza uses her house in Chicago, to question her society and the cultural customs that weigh on her due to her identity as a young Chicana woman. She observes the women of her community to find a role model of her own, and she looks at both their negative and positive aspects and uses what she has learnt from her observations to form an identity for herself.

Magdalena "Nenny" Cordero – She is Esperanza's youngest sister, the protagonist mentions that they are both very different from one another. She is described as having slippery hair.

Rachel and Lucy Guerrero – They are sisters, around the same age as Esperanza and Nenny, from Texas but now living on Mango street. They buy an old bike together and share it between them. They are described as having “fat popsicle lips” like the rest of their family. They all share a moment in the book where they are trying out high heels together. Until a man tries to convince Rachel to give him a kiss, that is when they give up “being beautiful.”

Sally – She is one of Esperanza's closest friends and mentioned in several of the vignettes in the novel. There is one full vignette dedicated to this character. The author describes her as “the girl with eyes like Egypt and nylons the color of smoke.” This is the first phrase in the chapter, and it seems to embody the type of dreams Sally holds for herself. The protagonist is  attracted to Sally's way of being and considers her to be a true friend, she likes being around her.

Sally seems to represent the vicious cycle of domestic violence and repression felt by women on Mango street.  She is utterly desperate to find a man to marry her, to escape the beatings and maltreatment she gets from her father at home. This ‘vicious cycle’ is seen when Esperanza goes and tells Sally's mother that her daughter is in a garden with three boys and the mother completely disregards this, her mother doesn't seem surprised or worried. Her mother cares for her cuts and bruises allowing for the violence to perpetuate, both mother and daughter give excuses to the father. The bare fact that Sally marries at such a young age to a man that ends up treating her just like her father, shows how this cycle is so ingrained in the way of life of many women, and passed from generation to generation. The author pities this character, not blaming her for what happened to her, Sally was very young and immature to fully understand her surroundings, to find a way out.

Marin – She is a cousin of the Louie's family, neighbors of Esperanza's family, she has come to stay from Puerto Rico. She is older than Esperanza, she wears dark nylons and a lot of makeup. She has a boyfriend back in Puerto Rico, and shows off her mementos from him to the younger girls saying how he promised they would get married soon. Esperanza looks up to her, as a figure of wisdom, of knowing many things. Marin imparted a lot of advice to the younger girls. She wore shorter skirts and had pretty eyes, received a lot of attention, yet the protagonist will always remember her as someone who was always waiting for something to change, something that never came. This character represents many of the young women in the neighborhood.

Esperanza's Mother – Esperanza's mother. One of the first descriptions is that she has hair like little rosettes, like little candy circles all curly from the pins she uses for her hair. Her mother's smell made her feel safe, her mother is her pillar, wanting the best for Esperanza. The vignette “A Smart Cookie” is dedicated to her mother. Her mother can speak two languages, can sing opera, reads, writes, she is handy around the house, she could’ve been anything she wanted, yet she regrets not having gone anywhere and dropped out of school. Her mother expressed disgusted that she dropped out of school for now having nice clothes. Several times throughout the book she encourages Esperanza to keep studying. Esperanza's mother is described as obedient with an undemanding nature.

Alicia – Alicia is a young woman who lives in Esperanza's neighbourhood. She attends university and has a father who is thought to molest her and leave her to do all the chores. Alicia is also faced with many challenges, as women attending college at that time, especially lower-income Latina girls, was very uncommon, and the community judged her for that. Nonetheless, Alicia is thought to be a role model for Esperanza. Alicia's attendance at university allows her to escape their community and see the outside world. Returning to the neighbourhood from school, Alicia seems to have developed a disrespect for the cultural community of Mango Street and Esperanza notices that she is "stuck-up". Throughout the novel, Esperanza wishes to learn from Alicia. Ultimately, Alicia wants to be a true American and for the community to solely be part of her past.

Alicia is an inspiration to Esperanza and listens to Esperanza's sadness when she has no one else to talk to. Esperanza learns a lot from Alicia and her lifestyle, realizing that Alicia does not "want to spend her whole life in a factory or behind a rolling pin"  and instead pursues university and studies hard. Alicia plays a big role in understanding Esperanza's identity and its relationship to Mango Street. She confirms the intimacy between the two by stating "Like it or not you [Esperanza] are Mango Street."

Aunt Lupe  – Aunt Lupe is primarily present in the vignette "Born Bad," in which Esperanza scolds herself for mimicking her dying aunt. Aunt Lupe is thought to "represent the passivity that women are so revered for in Mexican culture, that passivity which makes women accepting of whatever it is their patriarchal society chooses for them." Aunt Lupe married, had kids and was a dutiful house wife. However, she suffered crippling illness that left her bedridden. Esperanza describes how her aunt went blind and her "bones gone limp as worms"  She is thought to be representative of la Virgen de Guadalupe, as her proper name is Guadalupe.  Aunt Lupe also encourages Esperanza to pursue writing, as she tells Esperanza that "writing would keep her free." Aunt Lupe eventually dies from her illness.

Themes

Gender
Critics have noted that Esperanza's desire to break free from her neighborhood is not limited to a desire to escape poverty but also to escape strict gender roles she finds oppressive within her culture. Esperanza's discovery of her own feminist values, which contradict the domestic roles prescribed for Chicana women, are a crucial part of her character development throughout the novel. In keeping with this idea, Cisneros dedicates the novel "a las mujeres," or, "to the women."

Esperanza struggles against the traditional gender roles within her own culture and the limitations that her culture imposes upon women. Scholar Jean Wyatt writes, quoting Gloria Anzaldúa, that "Mexican social myths of gender crystallize with special force in three icons: 'Guadalupe, the virgin mother who has not abandoned us, la Chingada (Malinche), the raped mother whom we have abandoned, and La Llorona, the mother who seeks her lost children.' According to the evidence of Chicana feminist writers, these 'three Our Mothers haunt the sexual and maternal identities of contemporary Mexican and Chicana women.'"

Every female character within the novel is trapped by an abusive partner, teenage motherhood, or poverty, except Esperanza. Esperanza finds a way out of patriarchal oppression. The lesson Cisneros wishes to express is that there is always a way out for women who are trapped in one way or another. Critic María Elena de Valdés argues that gender plays a large part in the suppression of women; it forces them to diminish themselves to the service of others, particularly in domestic life. Through her writing, de Valdés says, Esperanza creates herself as a subject of her own story and distances herself from these gendered expectations.

In an article focused on the role of high heels in the text, Lilijana Burcar argues that Cisneros offers a "critical dissection" of the role that such attributes of femininity play in constructing young women's self-image. It is argued that high heels do not only constrain women's feet but also constrain their role in society. Esperanza and her friends are given high heels to wear as part of an unofficial rite of initiation into their community, and society. We see this in the vignette entitled "The Family of Little Feet," which tells of a mother who introduces her daughters to high heels, leaving the girls with an initial glee, as if they were Cinderella. Yet this is also described as a horrifying experience for one of the girls, for she feels like she is no longer herself, that her foot is no longer her foot, as the shoe almost dissociates the woman from her body. And yet, as Burcar observes, "presented with a lesson on what it means to be a grown-up woman in American contemporary patriarchal society, the girls decide to cast away their high-heeled shoes."

Burcar expresses Esperanza Cordero's life as one of being the “antidote” to the predestined lives lived by the other female characters. Women that have dreams but due to their circumstances and the vicious cycle of domestication forces of a patriarchal society they are confined to the same destiny of the women that came before them. A destiny that is centered in being a full-time wife, mother, in the home. Esperanza, as a character, is formed outside of those gender norms, she is presented as the only one that rebels. Choosing to set this mainly in the years of prepubescence is important for those are the years where young women are taught to become socially acceptable, they are introduced to high heels, specific forms of behaviors, etc., and like this,  at a very young age, they are molded into something that fits with the rules of the community where they are to become completely dependent on a man. This is the case for Esperanza's mother, who is uncommonly knowledgeable for the demographics of women on Mango Street, yet doesn't know how to use the subway. Here, Burcar notes that "the traditional female bildungsroman has played a direct role in endorsing and upholding the cult of domesticity for women and the image of a woman as the angel in the house.” The author goes on to argue that capitalism plays a direct role in the perpetuation of the roles of women in society, as it is founded on the domestication of women where men can work and fulfill the role of “breadwinner.”

There is economic dependency on women remaining in the home, and with these foundations that Esperanza begins with her "own quiet war. [. . .] [where she] leaves the table like a man, without putting back the chair or picking up the plate" versus being the servant, the woman, who puts back the chair and picks up the plate.  Burcar argues that the novel ends on a note where it blames a patriarchal system for the entrapment of Mexican-American women in the home. For Esperanza, joining mainstream America (having a "house of [her] own") will allow her freedom as a woman. However, Burcar contends that this emancipation comes at the expense of the sacrifice of other women, women that came before her, particularly her mother.

Domestic and sexual abuse
Episodes of patriarchal and sexual violence are prevalent in demonstrating women's issues in the Chicano community in The House on Mango Street. McCracken argues that "we see a woman whose husband locks her in the house, a daughter brutally beaten by her father, and Esperanza's own sexual initiation through rape." As McCracken notes, many of the men portrayed in the stories "control or appropriate female sexuality by adopting one or another form of violence as if it were their innate right." The many stories of Esperanza's friend Sally is an example of this patriarchal violence, as mentioned by McCracken. Sally is forced into a life of hiding in her house and her father beats her. She later on escapes her father's violence through marriage where she is dependent and controlled by another man. As McCracken analyzes, "her father's attempts to control her sexuality cause Sally to exchange one repressive patriarchal prison for another." The House on Mango Street offers a glimpse of Esperanza's violent sexual initiation and also portrays the oppression and domestic abuse faced by other Chicana women. Together with Esperanza's experience of sexual abuse the "other instances of male violence in the collection-Rafaela's imprisonment, Sally's beatings, and the details of Minerva's life another young married woman whose husband beats her and throws a rock through the window-these episodes form a continuum in which sex, patriarchal power, and violence are linked."

Adolescence

The theme of adolescence is dominant throughout the book. The actual timeline of the story is never specified, however, it appears to chronicle a couple of crucial years of Esperanza Cordero's life in her Chicano neighbourhood. We see her transition from a naive child into a young adolescent woman who acquires a graphic understanding of the "sexual inequality, violence, and socioeconomic disparities."  Esperanza is often torn between her identity as a child and her emergence into womanhood and sexuality, especially when she witnesses her friend, Sally, enter into the Monkey Garden to kiss boys. At this moment, she looked at her "feet in their white socks and ugly round shoes. They seemed far away. They didn't seem to be my feet anymore. And the garden that had been such a good place to play didn't seem mine either."

With coming of age, the young women in the novel begin to explore their boundaries and indulge in risky behaviours. When Esperanza, Nenny, Lucy, and Rachel are given high-heeled shoes, they experiment with walking like a woman. They often observe older women with a mix of wonder and fear for their futures. The attention men give them is unwanted by Esperanza, but her friends feel a bit more conflicted because attention from the opposite sex is representative of their self-worth. Esperanza is different than her friends; she wants to break free and live life by her own rules.

Identity
María Elena de Valdés argues that Esperanza's "search for self-esteem and her true identity is the subtle, yet powerful, narrative thread that unites the text." The aesthetic struggle that occurs in this piece takes place in Mango Street. This location, this world, becomes involved in the inner turmoil felt by the character. The main character uses this world as a mirror to look deeply into herself as, in de Valdés's words, she "comes to embody the primal needs of all human beings: freedom and belonging." Here the character is seen trying to unite herself with the notions she has of the world around her, Mango Street.

The relationship the protagonist has with the house itself is a pillar in this process of self-discovery, the house is in itself a living being as well, as mentioned by de Valdés. Her neighborhood engenders the battles of fear and hostility, of dualistic forces, of the notion of "I" versus "them". The character is impressed upon by these forces and they guide her growth as a person.

The House itself plays a very important part, especially in how the narrator reacts to it. She is fully aware that she does not belong there, everything about it is described in negative terms delineating everything that it isn't versus what it is. It's by knowing where she doesn't fit that she knows to where she might fit. It is similar to the concept of light and dark. We know that darkness is the absence of light, in this case her identity exists outside of this house on mango street.

Belonging
Esperanza Cordero is an impoverished child and wishes to find a sense of belonging outside of her own neighbourhood as she feels  "this isn't my house I say and shake my head as if shaking could undo the year I've lived here. I don't belong. I don't ever want to come from here." Esperanza attempts to find such belonging in the outside world as she perceives this as a safe place that would accept her. She eminants this desire to belong through little things, such as favouring English over the Spanish typically used in her community or actively desiring the purchase of a house outside of Mango Street. In other words, Esperanza's sense of belonging is absolutely dependent on separating herself from her Spanish native tongue, community and ultimately away from Mango Street.

Marin is another character who is thought to lack belonging. Marin "is waiting for a car to stop, a start to fall, someone to change her life"  and although she is supposed to leave Mango Street, the possibility is unlikely as she lacks the money and independence to leave. Esperanza sees Marin as an individual who is only capable of longing, but not able to really belong as her dreams and desires are romanticized and unrealistic.

Language
Esperanza uses the occasional Spanish word, and as Regina Betz observes, "Spanglish frequents the
pages where Esperanza quotes other characters" but "English is the primary language in Cisneros's novel." This is a sign, Betz continues, that her identity is "torn" between "her English tongue [. . .] and her Spanish roots." Betz argues that "Both author and character claim themselves as English in order to flourish as writers and independent women."

Furthermore, it is thought that the language barriers present in The House on Mango Street is a symbol of the boundary between one's self and the freedom and opportunities that are present in the rest of America. In addition, there is a certain value that is attributed to bilingualism in this book, while Spanish speakers are scoffed at and pitied.

Chicano literature and culture 

The House on Mango Street is an example of Chicano literature and explores the complexities of its culture. Through Esperanza Cordero, the heroine of this novel, Sandra Cisneros demonstrates that the "patriarchal Chicana Chicago community that raised her will not permit her development as a female writer". Through this book, she addresses the oppression that many women feel when growing up in Chicano communities, such as Mango Street.

Adaptation
On January 22, 2020, Deadline Hollywood reported that The House on Mango Street would be adapted into a television series by Gaumont Film Company, who previously produced the largely Spanish language series Narcos.

Critical reception
The House on Mango Street, Cisneros' second major publication, was released to critical acclaim, particularly earning praise from the Hispanic community for its realistic portrayals of the Hispanic experience in the United States. Bebe Moore Campbell of The New York Times Book Review wrote: "Cisneros draws on her rich [Latino] heritage . . . and seduces with precise, spare prose, creat[ing] unforgettable characters we want to lift off the page. She is not only a gifted writer, but an absolutely essential one." The book won Cisneros the American Book Award from the Before Columbus Foundation (1985) and is now required reading in many school curriculums across the United States.

Challenges and attempted banning 
Despite its high praise in the realm of Latino literature, The House on Mango Street has also received criticism for its sensitive subject matter and has been banned from several school curriculums. The American Library Association has listed the book as a "Frequently Challenged Book with Diverse Content". For example, in 2012 the St. Helens school board in Oregon removed the book from its middle-school curriculum, expressing "concerns for the social issues presented." In response, Katie Van Winkle, a former student at St. Helens, launched a letter-writing campaign on Facebook. Her efforts to "save Mango Street" were successful and the St. Helens school board voted to keep The House on Mango Street in its curriculum.

The House on Mango Street was also one of the 80-plus books that were part of the Tucson Unified School District's K-12 Mexican-American studies curriculum before the program was dismantled under Arizona House Bill 2281. This law "forbids classes to advocate the overthrow of the United States, promote racial resentment, or emphasize students' ethnicity rather than their individuality." When the Mexican-American Studies program was ended, all the books that were associated with it, including "The House on Mango Street", were removed from the school's curriculum.

In response, teachers, authors, and activists formed a caravan in the spring of 2012. The caravan, called the Librotraficante Project, originated at the Alamo and ended in Tucson. Its participants organized workshops and distributed books that had been removed from the curriculum. Cisneros herself traveled with the caravan, reading The House on Mango Street and running workshops about Chicano literature. She brought numerous copies of the book with her, distributed them, and discussed thematic implications of her novel as well as talked about the book's autobiographical elements.

Publication history
The House on Mango Street has sold well over 6 million copies and has been translated into over 20 languages. For its 25th anniversary in 2008, Mango Street was reissued in a special Anniversary edition.

 1983, United States, Arte Público Press , Pub date 1983, paperback
 1984, United States, Arte Público Press , Pub date 1 January 1984, paperback
 1991, United States, Vintage Contemporaries , Pub date 3 April 1991, paperback

An Introduction was included in the novel in 2009, it can be found in the 25th anniversary edition of the book .

See also
 Chicago Literature
Chicano Literature
 Chicana Feminism
 Chicano Movement

References

Sources
 
 
 .
 . MA Thesis, Rice University.
 
 
 .
  Originally published as 
 
 .
 
 
 .
 
 .
 .
 .

1983 American novels
American children's novels
American young adult novels
Novels by Sandra Cisneros
Hispanic and Latino American novels
Novels set in Chicago
Chicano literature
American bildungsromans
American Book Award-winning works
American novels adapted into plays
Censored books
Obscenity controversies in literature